Porpidia submelinodes is a species of saxicolous (rock-dwelling), crustose lichen in the family Lecideaceae. Found in the South Shetland Islands of Antarctica, it was formally described as a new species in 2011 by lichenologists Piotr Osyczka and Maria Olech. The type specimen was collected from Penguin Island, where it was found growing on a volcanic boulder. The lichen has a rusty orange thallus comprising distinct rounded areoles surrounded by deep cracks, and an inconspicuous black prothallus. It has soralia that are black with a whitish rim. All examined specimens were sterile, producing neither apothecia nor pycnidia. All chemical spot tests are negative, and the species does not contain any lichen products detectable with thin-layer chromatography. The species epithet refers to its similarity with Porpidia melinodes.

Zwackhiomyces martinatianus is a lichenicolous fungus that has been recorded growing on Porpidia submelinodes.

References

Lecideales
Lichen species
Lichens described in 2011
Lichens of Antarctica